Hans "Hasse" Persson (20 January 1929 – 29 July 2001), often called HP, was a Swedish football forward who in his time was immensely popular in the football club Landskrona BoIS.

Biography
Hasse "HP" Persson started his football career in his hometown Klippan before the age of 20, and in 1949 he took the step to Helsingborgs IF and Allsvenskan. There, he soon blossomed into his role as left inner and got his debut in the Swedish national team. His first game for Sweden was in September 1952 in Helsinki in an international match against Finland and he made a hat trick in an 8-1 triumph. The next international against Norway that same autumn he made the decisive 2-1 goal, and he also scored in his international game number three, against Italy. In this match, however, he injured his neck and had to leave the game in half time. The injury came to be fatal, and as a result of it he had to say no to test games with Italian side AC Milan.

Hasse Persson was something of a bohemian. Many are the stories of a willful and exuberant gentleman who often went his own ways. After a turbulent time, he left Helsingborgs IF. In 1955, HP wrote a contract with Helsingborgs IF arch rivals, Landskrona BoIS. In Landskrona, he soon became a big star in the city and it is said that he alone brought big crowds to Landskrona IP. There are many citizens in Landskrona who believes that the club never had a better player than Persson. Many of those who experienced the 1950s and 1960s have their special Hasse Persson-memories. This is almost always about goals from impossible distances, rocket shots, phenomenal assists or various other technical showpieces.

Even during the years in Landskrona professional clubs were interested in contracting him, for example Italian side Udinese Calcio. During Hasse Persson time in BoIS the club played qualification games to Allsvenskan no less than three times: in 1958, 1959 and 1962. Landskrona BoIS failed, however, to take the step up in all occasions. In the qualifying game in 1959 against Degerfors IF a new attendance record for Landskrona IP with 18 535 spectators was created, a record that still stands today. Hasse Persson winded down in his home club Klippan in 1966. He continued to be a welcome guest at Landskrona IP even after his career ended. He died in 2001.

References

Möller, Lars (2 February 2007). "En legend redan när han levde". hd.se. Helsingborgs Dagblad.
Majlard, Jan (3 April 2004). ""HP" gav krydda åt Landskronas mål". svd.se. Svenska Dagbladet.

1929 births
2001 deaths
Swedish footballers
Footballers from Skåne County
Landskrona BoIS players
Helsingborgs IF players
People from Klippan Municipality
Association football forwards